Florent Rajaoniasy (born 12 November 1992) is a Malagasy football midfielder.

References 

1992 births
Living people
Malagasy footballers
Madagascar international footballers
Academie Ny Antsika players
AS Adema players
La Passe FC players
Association football midfielders
Malagasy expatriate footballers
Expatriate footballers in Seychelles
Malagasy expatriate sportspeople in Seychelles